Tuffnell is a hamlet in the Canadian province of Saskatchewan.

History 
The first post office was established in 1907 under the name of Fountain (with Charles Woodhead as postmaster). The name of the community changed to Tuffnell in 1909.

Demographics 

Notable people
Dickson Delorme, farmer, YouTuber (Quick Dick McDick), comedian

References

Designated places in Saskatchewan
Foam Lake No. 276, Saskatchewan
Organized hamlets in Saskatchewan
Division No. 10, Saskatchewan